Prvić (pronounced , or Parvić in the Chakavian dialect; Pervicchio in Italian) is an uninhabited island in the Croatian part of the Adriatic Sea, located in the Kvarner Gulf. It is the largest of the so-called Senj Islands, a group of small islands and islets  located off the coast of the mainland city of Senj, lying between the larger islands of Krk and Rab. Other significant islands in the Senj group are Sveti Grgur and Goli Otok, along with a number of islets and rocks, which are all uninhabited.

Geography

Prvić is located southeast of Krk, separated from it by an 800 m wide Senj Passage (Senjska vrata) and it is geomorphologically considered part of the same landform as the Obzova hill, Krk's highest peak (578 meters above sea level), which forms the southwestern part of the Baška cove with the coastal town of Baška. Harbours nearest to Prvić are Sveti Juraj, a hamlet near Senj at the foot of the Velebit, and Baška on the island of Krk. Its westernmost point is called Debeli Art and its northernmost point is cape Brezonjin, where the automatic Stražica Lighthouse is located.

Three km southwest of Prvić is the island of Sveti Grgur (or Saint Gregory, also known as Šagargur, its name in the Chakavian dialect), separated from Prvić by the Grgurov kanal (Eng: Gregory's Channel). In addition, three kilometres to the south of Prvić's southernmost point, cape Šilo, is Goli otok (lit. Barren Island). Like Prvić, both Sveti Grgur and Goli otok are today uninhabited.

Prvić's highest peak is Šipovac (357 meters above sea level). Although most of the island is inaccessible as its coastal areas are made up of steep barren cliffs 250–300 m high, the western slope where the lighthouse is located has several gullies through which the island's plateau can be reached. The western side also has several coves which are suitable for swimmers, and near the beach called Njivice on the southwestern part of the island the remains of a medieval settlement owned by the House of Frankopan were found. The sea around the island is on average 70–90 meters deep, with the deepest point being at cape Šilo, where a depth of 107 meters has been recorded.

Climate and natural history

The island is also notable for the bora wind (locally known as bura) which blows in gusts on average 203 days per year, and even reaches force of 11-12 on the Beaufort scale (indicating a violent storm or hurricane-force winds) 73 days per year, according to weather records which used to be kept by the lighthouse crew. Because of this, Prvić is considered the windiest Croatian island. Although the island is uninhabited, it is frequently used by shepherds for pasture and by local beekeepers who keep apiaries on the island. Prvić and parts of the nearby island of Krk are areas with the highest concentration of Common sage (kadulja) shrubs in the entire Croatian Adriatic, and honey produced by bees feeding on the plant's nectar is prized for its quality.

Griffon vultures, a protected bird species, are known to breed at Prvić, and their colony on the island is second in size only to their main breeding ground on the island of Cres, to the south of Prvić. The island marks the northern boundary of their coastal habitat. In addition, there are 17 species of endemic plants which grow on the island. Because of this the island of Prvić is legally protected as a botanical and bird reserve.

See also
List of islands of Croatia

References

External links

Article about Stražica lighthouse originally published in Novi list 
Stražica lighthouse at Plovput.hr 
Stamp depicting the Stražica lighthouse issued by the Croatian Post in September 2009 

Krk
Islands of Croatia
Islands of the Adriatic Sea
Uninhabited islands of Croatia
Landforms of Primorje-Gorski Kotar County